See Tejpura for namesakes

Tejpura is a town, apparently in Mahesana Taluka, Mehsana District, and former minor princely state in Gujarat, western India.

History 
The jurisdictional state in Mahi Kantha was part of Katosan Thana and was ruled by Kshatriya Makwana Koli Chieftains.

In 1901 it has a population of 1,034, yielding (together with the personal union) a state revenue of 3,500 Rupees (1903-4, all from land), paying 308 Rupees tribute to the Gaekwar Baroda State.

In 1940, the Attachment Scheme saw Tejpura and many other (tributary) petty (e)states merged into the Gaekwar Baroda State, its suzerain salute state, which in 1949 merged into independent India's Bombay State.

Rulers
The rulers of Tejpura were titled 'Thakor Saheb'.

Thakor Sahebs

1850 – 1860 Shamji (b. 1820 - d. 1860)
1860 – 1920 Kalbhadraji (b. 1840 -d. 1920)
1920 – 1945 Muldevji (b. 1860 - d. 1945)
1945 – 1947 Tulsidasji (b. 1890 - d. 1965)

Titular Thakor Sahebs

1947 – 1965 Tulsidasji (b. 1890 - d. 1965)
1965 – 1990 Alakkji (b. 1910 - d. 1990)
1990 – Present Rameshlchandraji (b. 1936 - Present)
Heir Apparent Yuvraj Jayendrasinhn(b. 1960 - d. 1995)

Current Heir Apparent Rajkunvar Rajendrasinh(b. 1996 - present )

See also 
 Tejpura (disambiguation)

References

External links and Sources 
 Imperial Gazetteer on dsal.uchicago.edu - Mahi Kantha

Princely states of Gujarat
Koli princely states